Liberty-Benton High School is a public high school near Findlay, Ohio, and the only high school in the Liberty-Benton Local School district. It is named for Liberty Township, the village of Benton Ridge, and Eagle Township. Its mascot is the bald eagle, and its school colors are blue and white, accented with red. It is also a member of the Blanchard Valley Conference. In 1995, the school expanded by building a new high school facility about a fourth of a mile from the main building. After the new building was completed, all sports programs except football, baseball, track, and softball were moved to the new building. Football and track continued at the main school until 2003. The baseball and softball teams played at Benton Ridge Park until fields at the new high school were finished in the late 2000s. The new high school hosts district tournaments in basketball, volleyball, and track.

Ohio High School Athletic Association State Championships

 Boys Basketball – 1995
 Girls Basketball - 2010
 Boys Track and Field – 1995, 2000, 2005
 Girls Cross Country – 1984, 1985, 1986, 1996
 Girls Track and Field - 2015, 2016
Girls Volleyball - 2019, 2021

Notable alumni
Aaron Craft - basketball point guard
A. J. Granger - basketball player, NCAA champion in 2000
Fred Hissong - U.S. Army Lieutenant General

References

External links
 District Website

High schools in Hancock County, Ohio
Public high schools in Ohio